Mario Sperone (1 July 1905 – 18 December 1975) was an Italian football manager and former player who played as a midfielder.

Club career

A midfielder, Sperone played his entire playing career with Torino, the team in which he collected 138 appearances (one in Coppa Italia) in nine consecutive seasons. He began his career in the first team on 10 February 1924 in a home game against Novese (5–0); winning the title in 1926–27 (later revoked) and in 1927–28. The last match he played was a loss away to Milan on 29 May 29, 1932, 6–1.

International career

On 17 April 1927 he debuted his international career with the Italy national team in a friendly match in Turin won 3–1 against Portugal.

Managerial career

With Torino he also took up coaching, succeeding Gyula Feldmann in 1938. The following season, he was the second-in-command to Ernest Erbstein, in 1940–41 to Tony Cargnelli and in 1941–42 to András Kuttik. In the postwar he managed Alessandria, winning the championship of Series BC Alta Italy 1945–46; in 1947–48 he won the league title at the helm of the Grande Torino, with a 16-point lead and 125 goals scored in 40 games played.

As an established manager, he led among others Lazio, Milan and Palermo, concluding his career on the bench of Alessandria in 1956–57, when he resigned with seven matches in the league left to play and was replaced by Luciano Robotti. He later worked for Torino as a scout.

Honours

Player

 Torino
 Italian Football Championship: 1927–28

Manager

 Torino
 Serie A: 1947–48

References

External links

1905 births
1975 deaths
Italian footballers
Torino F.C. players
Italian football managers
Torino F.C. managers
S.S. Lazio managers
A.C. Milan managers
Palermo F.C. managers
Association football defenders
Italy international footballers